Oh Sangwon (Hangul: 오상원) was a South Korean writer and journalist.

Life

Oh Sangwon was born on November 5, 1930 in Seoncheon, Pyeonganbuk-do, Korea. Oh graduated from Seoul National University with a B.A. in French and worked as an editorial writer for the Dong-a Ilbo. Oh died in 1985.

In 1953, his play “Corroding Fragments” (Nokseuneun papyeon) won the Association for New Theater (Singeuk hyeobuihoe)  contest. Oh debuted as a writer in 1955 when his short story “A Respite” (Yuye) was published in the Hankook Ilbo.

Work
The Literature Translation Institute of Korea summarizes Oh's contributions to Korean literature:

French behaviorism and existentialism, which he encountered in college, strongly influenced Oh Sangwon’s literary imagination. His works bear witness to the political chaos following the liberation and the tragedy of Korean War through characters that take bold actions to critique external reality. “A Betrayal” (Moban), a story that won him 1958 Dongin Literary Prize features a terrorist who must choose between his conscience and his duty to his political organization. “A Respite” presents a psychological study of a soldier taken captive while trying to save another man’s life and is awaiting execution. The soldier can be taken as a prototype of a superhuman, behavioristic man who makes humanistic choice even as he confronts his own mortality. “Period” (Pirieodeu), “Reality” (Hyeonsil), and “Contempt” (Momyeol) further explore the subject of Korean War.

In the 1970s, he shifted his attention away from creative writing to focus on a career in journalism, working as a reporter and editorialist for the Dong-a Ilbo. During this time, he published fabular satires of contemporary events. Political and social fables such as "The Old Fox” (Neulgeun yeou), “The King's Molar” (Imgeumnimui eogeumni), and “The Rabbit's Eyes” (Tokkiui nun) are collected in Oh Sangwon’s Fables (Oh Sangwon uhwa). In the 1980s he published semi-autobiographical short stories such as “Mountains” (San) and “The Overlapping Past” (Gyeopchin gwageo). He died on December 3, 1985.

Works in Translation
 A Respite in A Respite and other Korean Short Stories

Works in Korean (Partial)
Novels
 Records on White Papers (1958)
Short Stories
 A Betrayal
 A Respite
 Period
 Reality
 Contempt
 Mountains
 The Overlapping Past
Fables
 Oh Sanwon's Fables

Awards
 Dong-in Literary Award (1958)

References 

1930 births
Korean writers
1985 deaths
Seoul National University alumni
People from North Pyongan